Galaxy 3C (or Galaxy 13) is a communications satellite operated by PanAmSat from 2000 to 2006, and by Intelsat from 2006 to today. It spent most of its operational life at an orbital location of 95° W. Galaxy 3C was launched on June 15, 2002, with a Zenit-3SL launch vehicle, from 154°w, 00°s, and covered North America & S. America (optional) with twenty four transponders each on the C- and sixteen in Ku band.

References

External links 
 

Satellites using the BSS-702 bus
Spacecraft launched in 2002